Year 524 (DXXIV) was a leap year starting on Monday (link will display the full calendar) on the Julian calendar. In the Roman Empire, it was known as the Year of the Consulship of Iustinus and Opilio (or, less frequently, year 1277 Ab urbe condita). The denomination 524 for this year has been used since the early medieval period, when the Anno Domini calendar era became the prevalent method in Europe for naming years.

Events 
 By place 

 Europe 
 May 1 – King Sigismund of Burgundy is executed at Orléans after an 8-year reign, and is succeeded by his brother Godomar. He rallies the Burgundian army and begins plundering Frankish territory. 
 June 25 – Battle of Vézeronce: The Franks under Chlodomer, Childebert I and Chlothar I are defeated by the Burgundians and allied Ostrogoths near Isère (France), averting the Frankish advance into Burgundy. During the fighting Chlodomer is killed. Later Childebert annexes the cities of Chartres and Orléans.
 Queen Guntheuc, widow of Chlodomer, is forced into marrying Chlothar I. Her two children are murdered by him, but the eldest son Clodoald survives by escaping to Provence.  
 Boethius, Roman philosopher, is executed without trial, probably at Pavia, after a prison term during which he has written  The Consolation of Philosophy (approximate date).

 Central America 
 November 29 – Ahkal Mo' Naab' I, ruler of the Maya city of Palenque in southern Mexico, dies after a reign of 23 years. The city enters an interregnum which lasts a little over four years.

Births 
 September 18 – Kan B'alam I, ruler of Palenque (d. 583)
 He Shikai, high official of Northern Qi (d. 571)
 Xiao Daqi, crown prince of Northern Qi (d. 551) 
 Xiao Jing Di, emperor of Eastern Wei (d. 552)

Deaths 
 July 12 – Viventiolus, Archbishop of Lyon (b. 460)
 November 29 – Ahkal Mo' Naab' I, ruler of Palenque (Mexico) (b. 465)
 Boethius, Roman philosopher and writer (b. 480)
 Brigit of Kildare, Irish patron saint
 Chlodomer, king of the Franks
 Sigismund, king of the Burgundians
 Zhou She, high official of Southern Liang (b. 469)

References